Lawu is a highly endangered unclassified Loloish language of Yunnan, China. It has about 50 elderly speakers in Jiuha village 旧哈村, Shuitang district 水塘镇, Xinping County, Yuxi Prefecture, Yunnan Province. There are possibly also some speakers in Jiujia District 九甲乡, Zhenyuan County, Pu'er Prefecture, Yunnan Province. Lawu speakers are currently classified by the Chinese government as Lahu, but were formerly classified as Yi.

Classification
Cathryn Yang (2012) suggests that Lawu is most likely a Central Ngwi language, but notes that it does not classify with Lalo, Lahu, or the Lisoid (Lisu, Lipo, Lolopo) languages.

Andrew Hsiu (2017) suggests that Lawu is related to Awu of Xiaopingzi 小坪子, Daping Township 大坪乡, Yuanyang County, Yunnan, China, which is documented in Lu & Lu (2011). Together, Lawu and Awu form a Lawu or Lawoish language branch. The linguistic evidence suggests that the ancestors of the Awu had migrated down the Red River valley from further up northwest, and arrived at their present location after migrating downstream.

Lewu, which is currently extinct, may have been related to Lawu, but classification is uncertain due to the paucity of data.

References

Hsiu, Andrew. 2017. The Lawu languages: footprints along the Red River valley corridor.

Loloish languages
Languages of China
Endangered Sino-Tibetan languages